Jan Ligthart (11 January 1859 - 16 February 1916) was a Dutch teacher and philosopher. He became known for his innovative educational methods and the modernisation of the Dutch education system. He wrote many articles and books about education.

Biography
Jan Ligthart was born on 11 January 1859 in Amsterdam, in the Jordaan district. His father Cornelis Ligthart, was a carpenter and grocer, who suffered from epileptic seizures. His mother Anna van Spall, daughter of a pastor, came from Klundert. Both of his parents died during his childhood. Ligthart graduated from the Reformed Christian college of Bloemgracht.
Afterwards he worked in several schools as a teacher. In 1886, he married Marie Cachet, with whom he had three children, two daughters and one son. Due to his illnesses he was put in a sanatorium. On 16 February 1916 he died after falling in a canal and drowning.

External links
 
 
 

1859 births
1916 deaths
Dutch educators
Writers from Amsterdam
Accidental deaths in the Netherlands
Deaths by drowning